Wheal Jane is a disused tin mine near Baldhu and Chacewater in West Cornwall, England, United Kingdom. The area itself consisted of a large number of mines.

History

Wheal Jane was probably seriously worked for tin from the mid-18th century. Given the complexity of ore formation near granitic emplacements, amounts of arsenic, copper, silver and zinc were also worked at some time.

In around 1885, most of the nearby mines became uneconomic. Wheal Jane was able to struggle on for a few years, principally due to its arsenic revenue, but it too succumbed in around 1895. It re-opened in 1906 as part of Falmouth Consolidated, with a modernisation and cost reducing agenda, but it was to close again within a decade. Work recommenced at low intensity in the run up to World War II but interest was turning to more modern processing techniques to recover more tin from what was already available and the old mine spoil was re-worked until 1946.

It was re-opened again in 1969 and much development work was done underground and in improving the surface processing facilities and ownership eventually passed to Rio Tinto Zinc.

Like the remainder of Cornwall's tin mines (Geevor, Pendarves and South Crofty), it was dealt a body blow by the end of the International Tin Agreement in 1985 and the subsequent collapse of the world tin price. It never really recovered and the pumps were finally switched off in early January 1992.

Aftermath

Wheal Jane was not out of the news though; these were the days before Environmental Impact Assessments. With the pumps no longer de-watering the mine, groundwater levels rose and flooded the former working areas, picking up waste, washing over the exposed rock faces and contaminating the groundwater.

These eventually overtopped the drainage systems in January 1992 and acid mine drainage rose through the abandoned mine, escaped into the surface water systems, and flowed into the Carnon river and eventually into Falmouth Bay, killing fish and contaminating wild fowl. By 1994, remedial measures including the construction of large settling ponds, were in place. By 2002 the water treatment had cost more than £20 million.

See also
Mining in Cornwall and Devon
Camborne School of Mines
List of topics related to Cornwall

References

External links

 Wheal Jane Group
 More on acid mine drainage (AMD) at Wheal Jane
Wheal Jane Mine, Cornwall
Wheal Jane photos
Cornish Mining History
Cornwall Record Office Online Catalogue for Wheal Jane

History of Cornwall
Mines in Cornwall
Tin mines in Cornwall
Industrial archaeological sites in Cornwall